Brian Robert Edson Bernaola Acosta (born 17 January 1995) is a Peruvian footballer who plays for Alianza Universidad, as a centre back.

Honours 
Sporting Cristal
Winner
 Peruvian Primera División: 2014
 Peruvian Primera División: 2016

External links 
 

1995 births
Living people
People from Ica, Peru
Peruvian footballers
Association football defenders
Sporting Cristal footballers
Deportivo Municipal footballers
Sport Rosario footballers
Carlos A. Mannucci players
Deportivo Coopsol players
Atlético Grau footballers
Alianza Universidad footballers
Peruvian Primera División players
Peruvian Segunda División players
2015 South American Youth Football Championship players
Footballers at the 2015 Pan American Games
Pan American Games competitors for Peru
21st-century Peruvian people